Tang-e Si (also Romanized as Tang-e Sī; also known as Qal‘eh-ye Āqājān) is a village in Rostam-e Do Rural District, in the Central District of Rostam County, Fars Province, Iran. At the 2006 census, its population was 56, in 12 families.

References 

Populated places in Rostam County